A teleconference is the live exchange of information among several people remote from one another but linked by a telecommunications system. Terms such as audio conferencing, telephone conferencing and phone conferencing are also sometimes used to refer to teleconferencing.

The telecommunications system may support the teleconference by providing one or more of the following: audio, video, and/or data services by one or more means, such as telephone, computer, telegraph, teletypewriter, radio, and television.

Telcon is used as an abbreviation for both "telephone conference" and "telephone conversation".

Internet teleconferencing 
Internet teleconferencing includes internet telephone conferencing, videotelephony, web conferencing, virtual workplace, and augmented reality conferencing.

Internet telephony involves conducting a teleconference over the Internet or a wide area network. One key technology in this area is  Voice over Internet Protocol (VOIP).

A working example of an augmented reality conferencing was demonstrated at the Salone di Mobile in Milano by AR+RFID Lab.

See also

References 

 
Telecommunications